Nanuqsaurus (meaning "polar bear lizard") is a genus of carnivorous tyrannosaurid theropod known from the Late Cretaceous period (early Late Maastrichtian stage) Prince Creek Formation of the North Slope of Alaska, United States. It contains a single species, Nanuqsaurus hoglundi, known only from a partial skull and multiple undescribed postcranial and teeth elements.

Discovery and naming
These were first referred to Gorgosaurus and later to Albertosaurus. After preparation in the Perot Museum of Nature and Science (Dallas Museum of Natural History) it was recognized these represented a species new to science. The holotype, DMNH 21461, has been found in a layer of the Prince Creek Formation, dated at 69.1 million years. It consists of a partial skull with a lower jaw, which were found very close together. It contains the nasal branch of the right maxilla; a partial skull roof including partial parietals, frontals and a right laterosphenoid; and the front of the left dentary. The specimen is from a fully mature individual, as it has a smooth nasal contact.

Nanuqsaurus was first described and named by Anthony R. Fiorillo and Ronald S. Tykoski in 2014. The type species is Nanuqsaurus hoglundi. The generic name is derived from the Iñupiaq word for "polar bear", nanuq, and the Greek word sauros, meaning "lizard". The specific name honors the philanthropist Forrest Hoglund, for his work on philanthropy and cultural institutions.

Description

Its weight has been estimated to be . This diminutive size was postulated by Fiorillo and Tykoski as being an adaptation to its high-latitude habitat. However, later studies suggested that its supposed small size was unfounded, and that it was likely similar in size to other North American tyrannosaurids such as Albertosaurus based on undescribed adult-sized teeth and postcranial elements.

Nanuqsaurus bears a particularly shaped ridge on its head indicating the carnivore was related to Tyrannosaurus rex.

Classified as a tyrannosaurine, Nanuqsaurus is diagnosed by: a thin, rostrally forked, median spur of the fused parietals on the dorsal skull roof that overlaps and separates the frontals within the sagittal crest, frontals with a long, rostrally pointed process separating the prefrontal and lacrimal facets and that the first two dentary teeth are much smaller than the dentary teeth behind them.

Classification
Phylogenetic analysis of the Tyrannosauridae finds Nanuqsaurus to be a close relative of Daspletosaurus and Tyrannosaurus within Tyrannosaurinae. Below is a cladogram illustrating the relationships of the Tyrannosauridae:

Paleobiology 

 
According to paleontologists, about 70 million years ago northern Alaska was a part of an ancient subcontinent called Laramidia and experienced cold weather and extreme changes in the amount of daylight during the year, with seasons in which food was not readily available. Prey availability likely would have increased substantially during the summer, but then declined in the dark winter, leaving predators with little to eat. Fiorillo and Tykoski stated that this lack of food might explain Nanuqsaurus'''s unusually small size for an advanced tyrannosaur, as a large animal cannot survive on scarce resources. Nanuqsaurus may have evolved a smaller size because of the decrease in year-round food supply, caused by the colder temperatures. In contrast, it was also found that the normal length of Troodon was 50% larger in Alaska compared to more southerly areas, possibly because a larger eye size allowed it to hunt more effectively in low-light conditions.

Paleoecology

The holotype specimen assigned to Nanuqsaurus comes from the Maastrichtian age Prince Creek Formation. At an age of 71–68 million years ago, the Kikak-Tegoseak Quarry region Prince Creek Formation dates to the early Late Maastrichtian. An average age found in dating rocks from the formation is 69.1 ± 0.3 million years ago, so it is likely that Nanuqsaurus is from around that age. The formation is along the Colville River on the North Slope Borough, and is made up of alluvial sediments. It is one of a few dinosaurs to live at very high-latitude areas.Nanuqsaurus lived alongside many other dinosaurs in the Prince Creek formation region during the Edmontonian faunal stage in a climate that was around 10 to 12°C during summer months and -2°C ± 3.9°C during the winter months. Other animals alongside Nanuqsaurus include an unnamed leptoceratopsid, the hadrosaurid Edmontosaurus (similar to E. regalis), an unnamed lambeosaurine, an unnamed thescelosaurine (mentioned to be similar to Parkosaurus and Thescelosaurus), an unnamed orodromine (mentioned to be similar to Orodromeus), the ceratopsid Pachyrhinosaurus perotorum, the pachycephalosaurid Alaskacephale, a large troodontid referred to the dubious genus Troodon, the dromaeosaurid Dromaeosaurus, the dromaeosaurid Richardoestesia (similar to R. isosceles), an unnamed saurornitholestine, an unnamed ornithomimosaur, and multiple avialans. In contrast to the contemporary large herbivores Edmontosaurus and Pachyrhinosaurus, which apparently preferred coastal lowland and upland environments respectively, Nanuqsaurus'' appears to have been fairly ubiquitous throughout the Prince Creek landscape.

See also

 Timeline of tyrannosaur research

References

Tyrannosaurids
Late Cretaceous dinosaurs of North America
Monotypic dinosaur genera
Fossil taxa described in 2014
Maastrichtian genus extinctions
Maastrichtian genus first appearances
Maastrichtian life
Paleontology in Alaska
Taxa named by Anthony Fiorillo